Mad Love is the third studio album by American singer-songwriter JoJo. The album was released on October 14, 2016, through Atlantic Records. Incorporating a base core of R&B, pop and soul music, JoJo wanted the album to take fans through a journey from beginning to end while not only being for her, but relatable to all the fans who stuck by her though her years in limbo, and to serve as the "soundtrack to peoples' lives". It serves as her first major official release in a decade following 2006's The High Road. A deluxe edition of the album featuring 4 bonus tracks was released simultaneously alongside the eleven-track standard edition. JoJo co-wrote every song on the album while also vocal producing every song. The album was JoJo's only album release under Atlantic Records, as she left in August 2017 to form her own label under Warner Records.

JoJo called upon the likes of Josh "Igloo" Monroy, Jussifer, Rock Mafia, Matt Friedman, Oscar Holter and MNEK as well as others, to handle production for the album. JoJo had recorded several incarnations of a third album while still contracted under Blackground Records since early 2008 that were ultimately shelved and scrapped following JoJo's release and signing with Atlantic Records in December 2013. The album had then begun production again from scratch and was re-written and recorded over a two-year period, with majority of the album being recorded in early 2016. Amongst those included are collaborations with rappers Wiz Khalifa and Remy Ma, in addition to her friend, Canadian singer Alessia Cara who featured JoJo in her video for "Scars to Your Beautiful" who features on a song called "I Can Only.". Occasionally the album dips into other genres such adult contemporary and soul music.

Mad Love was promoted with live renditions of the album's songs during the Mad Love World Tour. The album was also preceded by the release of the lead single, a Matt Friedman and Oscar Holter of Wolf Cousins production called "Fuck Apologies", featuring American rapper and Atlantic Records label mate Wiz Khalifa. The song became moderate success charting on the U.S. Billboards Pop Digital Songs chart, peaking at number forty. It became JoJo's first charting single in the UK since 2007's "Anything" peaking at number one-hundred and four on the singles chart and number eighteen on the UK R&B Singles Chart. "Mad Love.", "FAB." featuring Remy Ma and "Music." all served as promotional singles leading up to the album's release.

Upon its release, the album received generally favorable reviews from music critics, some noting that the album became JoJo's "bold coming-of-age statement" that helped cement her maturity and vocal growth since her previous album. Mad Love debuted on the US Billboard 200, Current Albums & Top Digital Albums chart at number 6, number 4 and number 2 respectively with 25,000 album-equivalent units, of which 19,000 were traditional album sales. A vinyl LP edition of the album was made available on February 3, 2017.

Background and development
Following the release of "Anything"—the final single from her second studio album The High Road—in late 2007, JoJo stated that she had been writing and working with producers for her third studio album, but would not go into the studio until early 2008. The album has spent a long time on hiatus, which was accompanied with a leak of many of its tracks. As of August 2011, thirty tracks leaked, well over an album's worth of material.

The album was preceded by the extended play III (pronounced "tringle"), which was released on August 21, 2015. Following its release, JoJo embarked on her second worldwide headlining "I Am JoJo Tour". Which saw her visit 23 cities nationwide with several international dates in Europe. Initially the tour and III release was a reintroduction for JoJo into the industry with a major label backing that had been lacking from her previous label. During this time, a large portion of the album had already been recorded. All three tracks from III were originally set to appear on JoJo's third album as the first 3 singles from the album that would each receive service to top 40 radio at different stages leading up to the impending album's release. Subsequently, during the tour, Levesque's father Joel had passed away in November 2015 due to struggles with addiction and had also broken up with her boyfriend of two years.

Senior Vice President of A&R at Atlantic Records at the time, Aaron Bay-Schuck orchestrated the deal and was instrumental to JoJo's signing with the record label. JoJo then began working on her third studio album for the label, However, on November 9, 2014 it was announced that Schuck would be leaving his position at Atlantic and was appointed the new President of A&R for Interscope Geffen A&M Records thus leaving JoJo without an A&R at the label.

In an interview with idolator, JoJo spoke about how the change affected the albums development stating "The A&R that signed me, Aaron Bay-Schuck, left and went to Interscope... He called me and was like, 'I have this thing. I don't wanna leave you. I don't wanna lose you. But I need to go.' I said, 'I completely understand,' but then I was left at Atlantic again and just kind of didn't know what to do. So I was given a lot of songs, I was recording a lot of things that didn't feel completely 100% authentic to me. But then after losing my father and going on tour and going through that experience, I got back in the studio at the beginning of this year and was like, 'I'm a soul singer. If I'm not coming from my heart, what am I doing?' I was just going through the motions a little bit because I wanted my shit to come out so bad. I was trying to make other people happy".

Following the tour's conclusion in December 2015, Levesque took a 6-day rest from work during the first week of January, where JoJo booked a hotel and spent time with herself and re-evaluated her life. As a result, JoJo was unhappy with the approach the album was taking and decided to "take control" and begun re-recording and re-writing the entire album to fit her new feelings and emotions. This resulted in the Tringle becoming its own stand-alone project with majority of the albums re-recordings taking place over a six-month period at the top of 2016, with only a few tracks from earlier Tringle recording sessions making it onto the final album, "I Am." and "Good Thing.". From September 9 to 15, 2016, JoJo uploaded short videos of her singing each song from the album on her Instagram account, revealing the track listing of the album. A vinyl LP edition of the album was made available through JoJo's official web-store on February 3, 2017.

Label conflict and move to Atlantic
Near the end of 2008, it was rumored that JoJo had parted ways with Da Family Entertainment and Blackground Records, and had signed a new record contract with Interscope Records. In early 2009, JoJo denied the rumor, saying that she was still signed to Blackground Records. Later in June 2009, JoJo confirmed that the album had been fully completed and will begin its promotion as soon as her record label finalized a new distribution deal. JoJo, after having waited almost two years to get her album released, decided to file a lawsuit against her label in August 2009. She was asking to be released from Da Family Records and to receive US$500,000 for her troubles. JoJo won the case, and in October 2009 Blackground Records reached a distribution deal with Interscope Records. When speaking of the label issues, JoJo says 

In late 2012, Blackground Records had failed to release JoJo's third album and lost its distribution deal with Interscope Records, putting JoJo in limbo unable to release any music at all as they controlled the money, promotion and masters of any recorded material. in an interview with Buzzfeed speaking on the album's delay, JoJo stated, "I’ve recorded about three incarnations of this third album... We’ve chosen the track listing, we’ve done multiple album photo shoots, chosen the cover, chosen the credits, everything." however every time her team tried to present the album to her label, they never received a response.

On July 30, 2013 New York Daily News reported that JoJo filed a lawsuit against Da Family Records and Blackground Records claiming that under New York State law, minors cannot sign contracts that last more than seven years. JoJo and her parents signed the contract in 2004 when she was 14. She argued that her contract was up in March 2011. JoJo additionally claims the label failed to release her third album despite delivery and acceptance of many master recordings; and that they were not able to retain their distribution agreement, which was a requirement of the recording contract. JoJo only released two of seven albums she signed to due to the label's dire finances. However, instead of freeing JoJo and allowing her to sign with another label with more resources, Blackground wanted to keep her under contract from signing with another label and making commercial success.

In mid December 2013, the lawsuit reached its conclusion with JoJo and Blackground settling outside of court, and subsequently JoJo signing her new contract the following day. The agreement states that Blackground would own all the master copies of all recordings JoJo submitted while still under contract, and in exchange JoJo would be released from her contract. On January 14, 2014, the Los Angeles Times exclusively reported that JoJo had officially signed a new recording contract with Atlantic Records thus ending her exhaustive muilti-year battle with Blackground Records and its imprint Da Family Entertainment.

Concept and title changes
In mid-2008, JoJo revealed that the album, titled All I Want Is Everything, was scheduled for a fourth quarter release that year, to coincide with her eighteenth birthday in December. The title was taken from the self-penned title track, which sums up her feelings about what she wants in life and how she can go about getting it as being an "inspirational anthem for everyone who has struggled and strives for more". The song is featured on her first mixtape Can't Take That Away From Me which was released on September 7, 2010 exclusively to Rap-Up.com.

In December 2010, it was announced that the album was no longer titled All I Want Is Everything On February 28, 2011, JoJo revealed the new title in a viral video. She said, "My third album will be called Jumping Trains and it's very symbolic for a variety of reasons... Moving from Boston to L.A., transitioning from being a girl to being a young woman, living on my own, taking a different direction sonically, and just really finding myself and just jumping into a new chapter of life." Following the albums continuous delay with her label Blackground Records JoJo filed a lawsuit against the label to get out of her contract and eventually signed with Atlantic Records, subsequently shelving all previous recorded material resulting in the album being written and recorded from scratch under Atlantic since February 2014.

During an interview with BBC Radio 1 in August 2016 JoJo was hush about announcing any details but stated that the album's title was two words first beginning with "M" and second beginning with "L". In a follow-up interview on March 28, 2016 with Malcolm Music during her "I Am JoJo Tour" in Europe JoJo spoke on a new song from album titled "Mad Love." calling it one of her "favorite songs" on the album suspecting fans to believe that was the album's title. On July 28, 2016 it was officially announced that JoJo's third album would in fact be titled "Mad Love", speaking on the meaning behind the album's title JoJo stated: "Mad Love. means so many different things, and I loved that about the title. It was one of the first songs that I wrote for this album, and I felt like it kind of shaped the intention of it, of this work. And, a phrase that I use in my family a lot, we say, 'I love you madly.' That's that 'I love you through it all, I love you as you are, I love you in a crazy way, in a deep way, in a way that other people might not understand.' And that's how I feel about music, and that's what my relationship is with my fans, and it's an intense, passionate love. That's also the love that I like to have in my romantic life. So, all of that is represented on this album."

Artwork
On September 7, 2016 just over a month away from the album's release, JoJo revealed the album artwork via her social media accounts and announced the album would be available for pre-order on September 16, 2016. Unlike JoJo's previous albums which both included a deluxe edition album with separate or modified artwork, a standard edition of the album artwork had been serviced to all markets. JoJo appears on the cover, "looking fierce as ever" while the rest of the artwork is otherwise blurred by paint smears and blots of pink, green, and white hues with the album art direction and design created by Nick Malvone. In early 2016 JoJo shot the album packaging photoshoot with LA based photographer Brooke Nipar. Photos from the shoot and a series of promotional/press photos were gradually released online, while others were released with the revamping of JoJo's official website.

Promotion
On June 6, 2016, prior to any official announcements for release of JoJo's third album. It was announced that JoJo would be joining Fifth Harmony on their 7/27 Tour as a special guest opener in promotion for their second studio album. The North American leg of the tour begun on July 27 in Manchester, New Hampshire before concluding on September 17 in Las Vegas.

On July 27, 2016, JoJo uploaded a short video on her YouTube channel titled "Mad Love. 10.14.16", previewing "Music." and revealing the album title and release date.
On July 26, 2016, JoJo debuted a short YouTube video that delivered a preview of new material to come from her forthcoming album. In it, scenes flash in and out, from present day to her past, showing what an impact music has had on her throughout the years. The video included a preview of a new emotional piano ballad titled "Music.". A more upbeat snippet of a song appeared at the end of the video later revealed to be the lead single.

The following day, JoJo announced the release of her new album through a shot of a pregnancy test and announced the first official lead single "Fuck Apologies", through her official Facebook page. That same day, the song was released to all digital retailers for purchase. Following the release, the songs accompanying music video debuted on JoJo's official website the next day.

JoJo performed "Fuck Apologies" for the first time live during her first stop on the 7/27 Tour closing her set with the song. She also performed a clean acoustic version of the song on the Elvis Duran and the Morning Show on August 1, 2016, along with a cover of Shawn Mendes' "Treat You Better". On September 30, 2016, JoJo made her first televised performance of the song along with Wiz Khalifa on MTV's newest music show Wonderland, where she also performed albums cuts for the first time including "FAB." and "Mad Love.". On October 14, 2016, JoJo performed "No Apologies", the clean version of "Fuck Apologies", on Today on October 14, 2016, and on Good Day New York on October 20, 2016. JoJo shot her first live TV performance of "Fuck Apologies." In late September 2016 and previewed new songs from the album including "FAB." and "Mad Love." on Revolt TV's original concert show "Revolt Sessions" which aired on October 22, 2016. A Remix EP of FAB. was released on March 3 despite not being serviced to radio as an official album single. It featured production from RealOnes, Kemist & DJ Braindead among others.

Singles

The album's lead single "Fuck Apologies" featuring Wiz Khalifa was teased by JoJo on July 26, 2016 in a promotional video previewing new music. The following day the single leaked in full online only hours before its release. The single was officially released as the lead single from the album on July 28, 2016. The music video, which was directed by Francesco Carrozzini, for the song was released on July 28, 2016, through JoJo's YouTube channel. The song debuted at number 40 on the US Pop Digital Songs Chart. Internationally, the song peaked at 104 on the UK Singles Chart and number 18 on the UK R&B Singles Chart. JoJo performed "Fuck Apologies" for the first time live during her first stop on the 7/27 Tour closing her set with the song. On October 14, 2016, she performed the song live on the Today show.

After its initial release as a promotional single, "FAB" featuring Remy Ma was released as the album's second single on November 29, 2016. A remixes EP for the single was released on March 3, 2017.

Promotional singles
"Mad Love." was released as the first promotional single on September 16, 2016, along with the pre-order of the album. JoJo released the audio video of the single on her YouTube channel. "FAB.", featuring Remy Ma, was released on September 23, 2016, as the second promotional single. The three letters form an acronym, which stands for "Fake Ass Bitches". "Music." was released as the third and final promotional single on October 6, 2016. In conjunction with the announcement of the Mad Love Tour, the music video for FAB. was released on November 29, 2016.

Tour

JoJo announced on Today that the Mad Love Tour will begin in early 2017. On November 30, 2016 JoJo announced her third headlining and second major world tour in support of her third studio album entitled the "Mad Love Tour". The 60-date "Mad Love World Tour" will travel throughout Europe and North America with the first leg of the tour beginning on Jan 15 in Dublin, Ireland and traveling across the UK for the month before concluding on Feb 1 in London. The second leg of the tour largely takes place in North America and began on Feb 15 in Portland, OR and travels to clubs and theatres across the country stopping in Seattle, San Francisco, Los Angeles, San Diego, Milwaukee, Chicago, Washington, Houston and more wrapping up in Huntington, NY on May 3. Craig Stickland and Stanaj were announced as opening acts for the UK and US leg of the tour respectively.

Critical reception

The album has received positive reviews from music critics. At Metacritic, it has a score of 70 out of 100 based on 6 reviews. Entertainment Weekly writer Nolan Feeney gave the album a B+ and wrote that JoJo's "well-documented struggles and triumphs inform her long-awaited third LP, Mad Love., and they turn her tales of love, friendship, and family into one bold coming-of-age statement". Idolator writer Jon Reyes gave the album 4 out of 5 stars and wrote that JoJo is "sauntering in with Mad Love sounding totally refreshed". Pitchfork writer Vanessa Okoth-Obbo gave the album 7 out of 10 stars and wrote that "Mad Love. sounds like an album that JoJo needed to make, and one that her fans were waiting for".

Year-end lists

Commercial performance
Mad Love debuted at number six on the U.S. Billboard 200, selling 25,000 album-equivalent units, of which 19,000 were traditional album sales in its first week. It charted three spots lower and with significantly lower sales than her second album. Mad Love also debuted on the Current Billboard Albums & Billboard's Top Digital Albums chart at number 4 and number 2 respectively. It became JoJo's first entry on the chart in 10 years. In its second week Mad Love dropped from number six to one hundred and eleven on the Billboard 200 on the week starting November 12, 2016. In its third week the album left the Billboard 200 chart.

Track listing

Notes
 denotes vocal producer
Track 7, "Honest." contains a hidden track titled "Cold." on the CD and digital versions of the album. It begins first behind "Honest." with the latter commencing approximately one minute and 19 seconds (1:19) into the track.

Personnel
Adapted from AllMusic and the album liner notes.

Creativity and management

Gita Williams – management
Katie Gallagher – management
Chris Smith – management
Evan Lipschutz – A&R
Doug Davis – legal
Benjamin Landry – Atlantic Business and legal affairs
Anne Declemente – A&R administration
Nina Webb – marketing
Brooks Roach – marketing
Carolyn Tracey – project director
Nick Malvone Bilardello – art direction, design
Brook Nipar – photographer
Dante Marshall – additional photographer
Tom Coyne – mastering

Performers

JoJo – lead vocals, background vocals
Alessia Cara – featured artist 
Wiz Khalifa – featured artist 
Remy Ma – featured artist 
Hayley Warner – background vocals
Jakob Hazell – background vocals
Jason Dean – background vocals
Joseph Kirkland – background vocals
Svante Halldin – background vocals

Technical

Delbert Bowers – mixing
Dexter Cabellon – assistant engineer
Eric Dawkins – vocal producer
Niklas Flyckt – mixing
Serban Ghenea – mixing
Ryan Gladieux – engineer, mixing
Steve Hammons – engineer
John Hanes – mixing engineer
Adam Hawkins – mixing
Oscar Holter – producer
Jack & Coke – producer
Jussi Karvinen  – producer
Joanna Levesque – vocal producer
Josh "Igloo" Monroy – engineer, mixing, producer
Erm Navarro – trombone
Noah Passovoy – engineer
Rock Mafia – mixing, producer
T.J. Routon – producer
Jacob Scesney – baritone saxophone, saxophone
Joakim Söderström – mixing assistant

Charts

Release history

References

External links
 Mad Love at AllMusic

2016 albums
Atlantic Records albums
JoJo (singer) albums
Albums produced by MNEK
Albums produced by Rock Mafia
Albums recorded at EastWest Studios
Albums recorded at Westlake Recording Studios
Albums produced by Oscar Holter